Sweet Kisses is the debut studio album by American singer Jessica Simpson, released in the United States on November 23, 1999, by Columbia Records. Its lyrical and visual representations carry the common theme of virginal innocence, a continuation of the late-1990s teen-pop revival. It was produced to capitalize on the success of teen artists Britney Spears and Christina Aguilera, who both debuted earlier that year. Sweet Kisses was a hit in the US, peaking at number 25 on the Billboard 200 albums chart, and was certified 2× Platinum by the Recording Industry Association of America (RIAA) for shipments of over two million copies. As of February 2009, it has sold 1.9 million copies in the US.

Sweet Kisses spawned three singles, including Simpson's debut single: "I Wanna Love You Forever", which is her biggest hit in the US. The second single was a duet: "Where You Are" with future husband Nick Lachey of 98 Degrees. The third single was a dance track: "I Think I'm in Love With You", which samples "Jack & Diane" by John Cougar Mellencamp.

Background
Simpson first developed and nurtured her talent in her local Baptist church, where her father also worked as the congregation's youth minister. At age twelve, she unsuccessfully auditioned for The Mickey Mouse Club. While attending a church camp, at the age of 13, Simpson sang Whitney Houston's "I Will Always Love You" and an arrangement of "Amazing Grace". One of the camp's visitors was launching a Gospel music record label and saw great promise and profits in her voice. It was during this time, while attending J. J. Pearce High School, Simpson signed to Proclaim Records, a minor Gospel music record label. She recorded an album, Jessica, but Proclaim went bankrupt and the album was never officially released except for a small pressing funded by her grandmother. This small pressing gained her minor attention which led her to performing at concerts with other gospel legendary acts such as Kirk Franklin, God's Property, and CeCe Winans. When she was seventeen years old, Columbia Records executive Tommy Mottola heard Jessica, he was impressed with Simpson's musical talent and skill. Mottola instantly thought Simpson sounded like Mariah Carey. Simpson was immediately signed to the label. She dropped out of high school but later earned her GED.

Simpson also collaborated with Sam Watters for the album. Watters produced the singles "I Wanna Love You Forever" and "Where You Are", as well as "Heart of Innocence". Watters also co-wrote the track "I Wanna Love You Forever", along with Louis Biancaniello. Carl Sturken and Evan Rogers also produced the tracks "I've Got My Eyes On You" and "Betcha She Don't Love You" together, though neither track was released as a single. Simpson's label wanted Sweet Kisses to be different from that of Aguilera's and Spears' debut albums, in that they were sexually risque, especially the lead singles from both albums. For Sweet Kisses, the label decided they wanted Simpson to be the "anti-sex appeal", to which Simpson would sing about love and romance rather than sexual themes. Simpson's "virgin" image was thought of as a great idea by the label, who felt that it would draw in listeners by making a girl whom they could relate to. Simpson also announced in an interview that she would be abstinent until marriage, which helped listeners give her the appearance the label was hoping for.

Music and lyrics
The album deals mainly with themes of love, romance, and life from a teenage perspective. "I Wanna Love You Forever" was written, composed, and produced by Louis Biancaniello and Sam Watters. The track is a darkly bittersweet love ballad, showing off the powerful vocals of Simpson. Even though Biancaniello and Watters are credited jointly for writing and composing the song, at present, it is not known exactly which of the two wrote its lyrics and which composed its music. According to the sheet music book published by Hal Leonard Corporation in Musicnotes.com, "I Wanna Love You Forever" is a common time signature song, with a beat rate of 80 beats per minute. It is set in the key of B minor with Simpson's voice ranging from the tonal nodes of B3 to F#5. The song follows a basic sequence of I–II–IV–II–VV progression.

Release and promotion
Sweet Kisses was released on 23 November 1999 through Columbia Records in United States, Canada, Australia and Europe. Following year, it was released in Japan, on 19 January 2000 through Sony Music Entertainment.

Singles
"I Wanna Love You Forever" was the first single of the album, and was released in September 1999. The song became Simpson's highest-charting single in the United States, peaking at number three on the Billboard Hot 100. Its commercial sales were particularly strong, and landed the single atop the Hot 100 Singles Sales for six weeks; this in turn earned the song a platinum certification. It was also a top ten hit in Canada. Worldwide, the single was successful, as it peaked within the top ten in most European nations and Australia, which reached the top ten in Norway, Sweden, United Kingdom, Switzerland, Belgium and Australia. "Where You Are" was released as the second single from the album. The single failed to reach even the top fifty of the Billboard Hot 100, peaking at sixty-two. The song did, however, become a relative Adult Contemporary hit. Strangely enough though, dance fans reacted strongly to the physical single of the song and the song became a hit on the Hot Dance Music/Maxi-Singles Sales reaching number four. Internationally, the song was not released in major music markets excluding Canada. "I Think I'm In Love With You" was the third and final single released from her debut album. It was more up tempo than Simpson's previous singles and became a moderate hit, reaching number twenty-one on the US Billboard Hot 100, largely on the strength of its radio airplay; it reached the top five on Billboard's Top 40 Mainstream and achieved success on the Adult Contemporary and Rhythmic Top 40 charts. Worldwide, it was a moderate hit, peaking at number ten on Australian ARIA Singles Chart, and reached the top twenty in Canada, United Kingdom and New Zealand.

Critical reception

The album received mostly mixed reviews. Allmusic gave the album three out of five stars, quoting, "She delves into the frothy dance-pop that's teen pop's stock-in-trade, but the heart of her album lies in adult contemporary ballads like her breakout hit "I Wanna Love You Forever," which gives her a chance to show off the richness of her voice. She doesn't over-sing, like Aguilera occasionally does, even if she has moments where she pushes the envelope slightly — just like her idol Dion. However, there are already indications that she's developing her own voice, since she is equally capable of delivering danceable urban R&B ("Final Heartbreak," "I've Got My Eyes on You," the Destiny's Child duet "Woman in Me") as she is mature balladry ("Faith in Me," the Nick Lachey duet "Where You Are"). Like most teen-pop albums, Sweet Kisses suffers from inconsistent material, yet the filler is well-produced and performed, making the record every bit as listenable as Aguilera's fine debut." People Magazine was less critical of the album, quoting "Blonde, pouty-lipped and impossibly cute, Jessica Simpson is as tough to pick out of a lineup of lookalike teenage songbirds as her breathless hit "I Wanna Love You Forever" is difficult to differentiate from the rest of Top 40 radio. So far, Simpson's debut album hasn't scored the same success as those of Britney Spears and Christina Aguilera. But rest assured there are more cookies like "I Wanna" in Simpson's cutter. One ditty, titled "Where Are You," is a duet with 98° boy-toy Nick Lachey, Simpson's real-life squeeze. Unlike her peers the 19-year-old Simpson is not a former member of Disney's Mickey Mouse Club. She auditioned for the show at age 12 but didn't make the cut. Also setting her apart from the teen pop pack is Simpson's track record as a performer on the Christian music circuit. Here, she sounds downright worldly singing "Heart of Innocence"—a devotional tune she wrote extolling the virtues of premarital abstinence—in a low, sexy croon. Bottom Line: Teen yearnings set to a watery R&B beat." Although Hot Sauce Reviews was critical of Simpson's oversinging, the review was overall positive of the album, writing that it has "enough fine pop tunes to make it an enjoyable listen" and concluded that "everything about Sweet Kisses is well-crafted, radio friendly pop stuff that is worth a listen", with the exception of "Where You Are". Sal Cinquemani of Slant Magazine praised Sweet Kisses as a hopeful debut when comparing her next album negatively to it.

Entertainment Weekly gave the album a C−, stating "Jessica Simpson, a melodramatic 19, chirps cheeky Mariah Carey-isms on Sweet Kisses, a subpar portfolio, missing the soulful target almost every time. 'Do you wanna see the woman in me?/Let me show you,' she lasciviously hisses in one laughable instance, backed by a doo-wopping Destiny's Child. Uh, thanks, but no, kid. Been there, done that. Mom's waiting for you outside in the station wagon." Robert Christgau wrote in The Village Voice: "Simpson is a blonde who got out of cheerleading early to prepare herself for whatever show business offered--game-show sidekick, R-rated remake of Debbie Does Dallas, bond trader seeking trophy wife. What she got was a John Cougar Mellencamp sample and the hard-earned ability to carry a tune. We know teenpop is rarely as vapid, prefab, and faux-wholesome as gatekeepers who've barely listened to it claim. So let's not tell them about this 'refreshing blend of pop, R&B and [note copywriter getting desperate] gospel-flavored sounds.'"

Commercial performance
Initially, the album debuted at number sixty-five on the US Billboard 200, selling 65,000 copies in its first week, significantly lower than expected by Columbia Records, as the first single from the album was a hit, peaking at #3 on the Billboard Hot 100. The following week, Sweet Kisses had dropped to number seventy, and continuing down the following weeks. To boost record sales, the label released the second single "Where You Are", but could not reach the success of its predecessor "I Wanna Love You Forever". While Sweet Kisses was kept in the top sixty for several weeks, the label decided to make one last attempt to launch the third single from the album. "I Think I'm in Love With You" was released in May 2000, instantly became a hit on radio stations that helped to rise from posts and the album reached the peak of twenty-five in August 2000. In total, the album stayed on the chart for sixty-two weeks. The album was certified 2× Platinum by the RIAA. As of February 2009, the album has sold 1.9 million copies in the United States. In territories outside of the United States, the album had a similar chart effect. In Canada, Sweet Kisses peaked at number thirty-four on the Canadian Albums Chart. The album stayed on the chart for 37 weeks. Later it was certified Platinum by the Canadian Recording Industry Association (CRIA; now Music Canada). 

In Europe, the album performed better on the charts, peaking at number four in Norway and was certified Gold for sales 15,000 copies in that territory. and number five in Switzerland and remains Simpson's only top five album in that territory. It also peaked at number fifty-five in Sweden. In Japan, the album debuted at number sixteen on the Oricon albums chart, making it her only album to date to chart within the top twenty in Japan. In the United Kingdom, where the singles were met with a great commercial performance, the album debuted at number thirty-six. This makes Sweet Kisses Simpson's highest-charting album in the United Kingdom, tied with her third studio album In This Skin (2003). In Australia, the album debuted at number fifty-two, surprising the label as the album had spawned two top ten hits in the country. In total, Sweet Kisses has sold four million copies worldwide.

Track listing

Sample credits

 "I Think I'm in Love with You" contains a sample of "Jack & Diane", written and performed by John Cougar Mellencamp.
 "Woman in Me" is a cover of Legacy of Sound.

Personnel

Jessica Simpson - vocals, background vocals
Anas Allaf - guitar
Louis Biancaniello - keyboard
Chris Camozzi - guitar
Graeme Coleman - piano, conductor
Destiny's Child - background vocals
Dave Deviller - acoustic guitar
Sherree Ford-Payne - background vocals
Andy Goldmark - keyboard
Tania Hancheroff - background vocals
Tim Hientz - keyboard
Simon Isherwood - conductor
London Jones - keyboard, background vocals
Nick Lachey - vocals
Gordon Maxwell - background vocals
Robbie Nevil - guitar
Notre Dame Gospel Choir
Dan Petty - acoustic guitar, electric guitar
Evan Rogers - background vocals
Jill Seifers - background vocals
Dwight Sills - guitar
Beverley Staunton - background vocals
Carl Sturken - multiple instruments
Michael Thompson - guitar
Sam Watters - background vocals
Eric Foster White - keyboard

Production

Producers: Louis Biancaniello, Dave Deviller, Andy Goldmark, Dan Shea, Jamie Houston, London Jones, Robbie Nevil, Evan Rogers, Corey Rooney, Carl Sturken, Sam Watters, Eric Foster White
Engineers: Steve George, Andy Goldmark, Scott Gutierrez, Al Hemberger, Ben Holt, Martin Horenburg, Hank Linderman, Glen Marchese, Tim "Flash" Mariner, Michael "Wolf" Reaves, Steve Smith, Paul Wagner, Eric Foster White, Rob Williams
Assistant engineers: Jeff Gregory, Matt Martiensson, Ronnie Rivera, Jose Sanchez, Manelich Sotolong
Mixing: Mick Guzauski, Tony Maserati
Mixing assistants: Tom Bender, Jeff Gregory, Ben Holt, Ethan Schofer
Editing: Jack Kugell
Production coordination: Kim Gorham, Collen Reynolds
Production coordination assistant: Andrea Derby
Programming: Louis Biancaniello, Dan Shea, Dave Deviller, London Jones, Eric Foster White
Drum programming: Iki Levy
Arranger: Dave Deviller
String arrangements: Graeme Coleman
Art direction: Ron Jaramillo
Design: Ron Jaramillo
Photography: Alberto Tolot
Stylist: Rachel Zoe
Hair stylist: Ken Paves
Make-up: Francesca Tolot

Charts

Weekly charts

Year-end charts

Certifications

Release history

References

1999 debut albums
Jessica Simpson albums
Albums produced by Sam Watters
Albums produced by Cory Rooney
Soul albums by American artists